Then Came the Morning is the second full-length studio album by the American folk rock trio the Lone Bellow. The album was released on January 27, 2015 by Descendant Records, and the producer was Aaron Dessner of the National.

Track listing

Personnel 
Zach Williams	Composer, Guitar (Acoustic), Handclapping, Stomping, Vocals
Kanene Donehey Pipkin	Composer, Handclapping, Mandolin, Stomping, Vocals
Brian Elmquist	Composer, Guitar (Acoustic), Guitar (Electric), Handclapping, Stomping, Vocals
Jason Pipkin	Bass, Bass (Electric), Guitar (Electric), Handclapping, Piano, Stomping
Michael Atkinson	French Horn
Thomas Bartlett	Fender Rhodes, Keyboards, Organ, Piano, Unknown Instrument
Greg Calbi	Mastering
Caleb Clardy	Composer
Logan Coale	Bass (Upright), Double Bass
Aaron Dessner	Arranger, Bass, Composer, Drums, Engineer, Fender Rhodes, Guitar (12 String), Guitar (Acoustic), Guitar (Electric), Handclapping, Hi String Guitar, Keyboards, Orchestration, Percussion, Producer, Stomping, Unknown Instrument
Bryce Dessner	Orchestration
Brian Griffin	Drums, Handclapping, Stomping
Jay Harren	A&R
Terry Hemmings	Executive Producer
Clarice Jensen	Cello
Peter Katis	Mixing
Matt Knapp	Lap Steel Guitar, Pedal Steel
Benjamin Lanz	Orchestration, Trombone
Nick Lloyd	Organ (Hammond), Piano
The Lone Bellow	Arranger, Primary Artist
Jonathan Low	Engineer
Rob Moose	Orchestration, Viola, Violin
Brian Murphy	Composer
Tim Parker	Design, Layout
Chris Pereira	Design, Handclapping, Layout, Photography, Stomping
Jeff Rogers	Design, Layout
Mackenzie Rollins	Photography
Steven Sebring	Photography
Caroline Shaw	Orchestration, Violin
Alexandra Sopp	Flute
Spencer	Handclapping, Stomping

References 

2015 albums
The Lone Bellow albums